Hypercompe brasiliensis is a moth of the family Erebidae first described by Charles Oberthür in 1881. It is found in Brazil and French Guiana.

The larvae have been recorded feeding on Gossypium herbaceum.

References

brasiliensis
Moths described in 1881